Mitre Peak is a mountain in the Karakoram mountain range near Concordia in Gilgit-Baltistan, Pakistan.

Mitre Peak marks the confluence of the branches of the Baltoro Glacier with the Gasherbrum branch arriving from the SE and the Godwin Austin branch arriving from the NE. It sits across from Broad Peak, the 12th highest mountain on Earth.

References

External links
 Mitre Peak on SummitPost

Mountains of Gilgit-Baltistan
Six-thousanders of the Karakoram